Antigone (Antigone) is a 1961 Greek film adaptation of the Ancient Greek tragedy Antigone by Sophocles. It stars Irene Papas in the title role and was directed by Yorgos Javellas.

The film follows the story of the play closely, but ends differently – instead of Creon retiring back to the palace as in the play, the film ends with Creon relinquishing his kingship and exiling himself out of Thebes.

Plot 
After Oedipus realises he married his mother Jocasta and stepped down as king of Thebes, his two sons Eteocles and Polynices kill each other in the struggle for the succession. Creon, Jocasta's brother, ascends the throne and give the order that the body of Polynices should remain unburied, since he assaulted Thebes to dethrone his older brother.

Oedipus' daughter Antigone, after trying unsuccessfully to involve her sister Ismene in her scheme, defies the prohibition and buries her brother. Creon arrests both sisters, but eventually decrees that only Antigone has to be walled up alive, although the young woman is engaged to his son Haemon.

Only the seer Tiresias manages eventually to open Creon's eyes and explains to him that the ban on the burial would anger the gods. It is however too late: even if Creon has Polynices buried and is willing to free Antigone, she has already hanged herself in her prison in the meantime. Shortly after, Haemon commits suicide as well and Creon, now broken by his own actions, renounces the throne.

Cast
 Irene Papas - Antigone
 Manos Katrakis - Creon, king of Thebes
 Maro Kontou - Ismene, Antigone's sister
  - Haemon, Creon's son
 Ilia Livykou - Eurydice, Creon's wife
 Giannis Argyris - A Sentry
 Byron Pallis - A Messenger
 Tzavalas Karousos - Tiresias
 Thodoros Moridis - First Elder of Thebes
 Giorgos Vlahopoulos - Elder of Thebes
 Yorgos Karetas - Elder of Thebes
 Thanasis Kefalopoulos - Elder of Thebes

Awards

Won 

 Thessaloniki International Film Festival 1961: Irene Papas (Best Actress), Argyris Kounadis (Best Music)
 San Francisco International Film Festival 1961: Manos Katrakis (Best Actor)

Nominated 

 Berlin International Film Festival 1961: Giorgos Tzavellas (Golden Bear)
 Golden Globe Awards 1962: Samuel Goldwyn International Award

References

External links 
 
 
Antigone at FilmAffinity

1961 films
Films set in ancient Greece
1960s Greek-language films
1961 drama films
Greek black-and-white films
Films based on ancient Greek plays
Films based on works by Sophocles
Films directed by George Tzavellas
Works based on Antigone (Sophocles play)